Elis or Eleia  (Elean:  ,) is an ancient district in Greece that corresponds to the modern regional unit of Elis.

Elis is in southern Greece on the Peloponnese, bounded on the north by Achaea, east by Arcadia, south by Messenia, and west by the Ionian Sea. Over the course of the archaic and classical periods, the polis "city-state" of Elis controlled much of the region of Elis, most probably through unequal treaties with other cities; many inhabitants of Elis were Perioeci—autonomous free non-citizens. Perioeci, unlike other Spartans, could travel freely between cities. Thus the polis of Elis was formed.

The local form of the name was Valis, or Valeia, and its meaning, in all probability was, "the lowland" (compare with the word "valley"). In its physical constitution Elis is similar to Achaea and Arcadia; its mountains are mere offshoots of the Arcadian highlands, and its principal rivers are fed by Arcadian springs.

According to Strabo, the first settlement was created by Oxylus the Aetolian who invaded there and subjugated the residents. The city of Elis underwent synoecism—as Strabo notes—in 471 BC. Elis held authority over the site of Olympia and the Olympic games.

The spirit of the games had influenced the formation of the market: apart from the bouleuterion, the place the boule "citizen's council" met, which was in one of the gymnasia, most of the other buildings were related to the games, including two gymnasia, a palaestra, and the House of the Hellanodikai.

History

Early history
The original inhabitants of Elis were called Caucones and Paroreatae. They are mentioned by Homer for the first time in Greek history under the title of Epeians (Epeii), as setting out for the Trojan War, and they are described by him as living in a state of constant hostility with their neighbours the Pylians. At the close of the 11th century BC the Dorians invaded the Peloponnese, and Elis fell to the share of Oxylus and the Aetolians.

These people, amalgamating with the Epeians, formed a powerful kingdom in the north of Elis. After this many changes took place in the political distribution of the country, till at length it came to acknowledge only three tribes, each independent of the others. These tribes were the Epeians, Minyae and Eleans. Before the end of the 8th century BC, however, the Eleans had vanquished both their rivals, and established their supremacy over the whole country. Among the other advantages which they thus gained was the right of celebrating the Olympic games, which had formerly been the prerogative of the Pisatans. Olympia was in Elian land, and tradition dates the first recorded games to 776 BC. The Hellanodikai, the judges of the Games, were of Elian origin. The attempts which the Pisatans made to recover their lost privilege, during a period of nearly two hundred years, ended at length in the total destruction of their city by the Eleans. From the time of this event in 572 BC until the Peloponnesian War, the peace of Elis remained undisturbed.

Peloponnesian War and later
In the war, Elis sided at first with Sparta. But Sparta, jealous of the increasing prosperity of its ally, availed itself of the first pretext to pick a quarrel. At the Battle of Mantinea (418 BC), the Eleans fought against the Spartans, who later took vengeance upon them by depriving them of Triphylia and the towns of the Acroreia.
The Eleans made no attempt to re-establish their authority over these places until Thebes rose in importance after the Battle of Leuctra (371 BC). However, the Arcadian confederacy came to the assistance of the Triphylians. In 366 BC hostilities broke out between them, and though the Eleans were at first successful, they were soon overpowered; their capital very nearly fell into the hands of the enemy, and the territory of Triphylia was permanently ceded to Arcadia in 369 BC. Unable to make headway against their opponents, they applied for assistance to the Spartans, who invaded Arcadia and forced the Arcadians to recall their troops from Elis. The general result of this war was the restoration of their territory to the Eleans, who were also again invested with the right of holding the Olympic games.

During the Macedonian supremacy in Greece they sided with the victors, but refused to fight against their countrymen. After the death of Alexander the Great in 323 BC they renounced the Macedonian alliance. At a subsequent period they joined the Aetolian League. When the whole of Greece fell to Rome, the sanctity of Olympia secured for the Eleans a certain amount of indulgence. The games still continued to attract large numbers of visitors, until they were finally ended by Theodosius in 394 AD, two years before the utter destruction of the country by the Gothic invasion under Alaric I.

Democracy in Elis
Elis was a traditional ally of Sparta, but the city state joined Argos and Athens in an alliance against Sparta around 420 BC during the Peloponnesian War. This was due to Spartan support for the independence of Lepreum. As punishment following the surrender of Athens, Elis was forced to surrender Triphylia in 399 BC
Eric W. Robinson has argued that Elis was a democracy by around 500 BC, on the basis of early inscriptions which suggest that the people (the dāmos) could make and change laws. Robinson further believes that literary sources imply that Elis continued to be democratic until 365, when an oligarchic faction seems to have taken control (Xen. Hell. 7.4.16, 26). At some point in the mid-fourth century, democracy may have been restored; at least, we hear that a particularly narrow oligarchy was replaced by a new constitution designed by Phormio of Elis, a student of Plato (Arist. Pol. 1306a12-16; Plut. Mor. 805d, 1126c).

The classical democracy at Elis seems to have functioned mainly through a popular Assembly and a Council, the two main institutions of most poleis. The Council initially had 500 members, but grew to 600 members by the end of the fifth century (Thuc. 5.47.9). There was also a range of public officials such as the demiourgoi who regularly submitted to public audits.

Geography

Districts
As described by Strabo, Elis was divided into three districts:
 Koilē ( "Hollow", Latinised Coele), or Lowland Elis
 Pīsâtis (Πισᾶτις "[territory] of Pisa")
 Triphylia (Τριφυλία Triphūlía "Country of the Three Tribes").

Koilē Elis, the largest and most northern of the three, was watered by the river Peneus and its tributary, the Ladon. The district was famous during antiquity for its cattle and horses. Pisatis extended south from Koilē Elis to the right bank of the river Alpheios, and was divided into eight departments named after as many towns. Triphylia stretched south from the Alpheios to the river Neda.

City
The city of Elis was the capital of the city state of Elis. It was located at the exit of the river Peneios from the mountains into the plain in the area of today's Ilida Municipality north of Kalyvia. It is said to have been founded in 471 BC by synoecism, however it is unclear what the ancient sources mean by this, the city already existed in the same place before and there were separate communities in the region of Elis before and after.

The first excavations in Elis were carried out from 1910 to 1914 by the Austrian Archaeological Institute under the direction of Otto Walter. From 1960 to 1981 the Archaeological Society of Athens carried out further excavations under the direction of Nikolaos Yalouris with Austrian participation. Some of the finds are exhibited in the local archaeological museum founded in 1981, for which a new building was built in 2003.

Nowadays Elis is a small village of 150 citizens located  NE of Amaliada, built over the ruins of the ancient town. It has one of the most well-preserved ancient theaters in Greece. Built in the fourth century BC, the theater had a capacity of 8,000 people; below it, Early Helladic, sub-Mycenaean and Protogeometric graves have been found.

Notable Eleans
Athletes
 Coroebus of Elis, the first victor at the Olympic Games.
 Troilus of Elis, 4th century BC equestrian
In mythology
 Salmoneus, Aethlius, Pelops mythological kings of Elis
Endymion
 Sons of Endymion:
 Epeius
 Aetolus
 Paeon
 Augeas, king of Elis related to the Fifth Labour of Heracles
 Amphimachus, king of Elis and leader of Eleans in the Trojan War
 Thalpius, leader of Eleans in the Trojan War
 Oxylus, king of Elis
Intellectuals
 Alexinus (c. 339–265 BC), philosopher
 Hippias of Elis, Greek sophist
 Phaedo of Elis, founder of the Elean School
 Pyrrho, founder of the Pyrrhonist school of philosophy

Eleans as barbarians

Eleans were labelled as the greatest barbarians barbarotatoi by musician Stratonicus of Athens

In Hesychius (s.v. ) and other ancient lexica, Eleans are also listed as barbarophones. Indeed, the North-West Doric dialect of Elis  is, after the Aeolic dialects, one of the most difficult for the modern reader of epigraphic texts.

Notes

External links

 Map from the Hellenic Ministry of Culture
 Elis - the city of the Olympic games
 Mait Kõiv, Early History of Elis and Pisa: Invented or Evolving Traditions?

 
Dorian city-states